Tamworth is a market town and borough in Staffordshire, England.  It contains 138 listed buildings that are recorded in the National Heritage List for England.  Of these, three are listed at Grade I, the highest of the three grades, five are at Grade II*, the middle grade, and the others are at Grade II, the lowest grade.  The town includes its central area and the districts of Amington, Bolehall, Dosthill, Fazeley, Glascote, and Wilnecote.  The most important buildings in the town are the Church of St Editha, and Tamworth Castle and its causeway walls, all of which are listed at Grade I.  Most of the listed buildings are houses and associated structures, shops and offices, many of which originated as houses.  The Coventry Canal passes through the town and makes a junction with the termination of the Birmingham and Fazeley Canal.  The listed buildings associated with the canals are bridges, an aqueduct, and a milepost.  The other listed buildings include churches and items in churchyards, public houses, bridges over the River Tame, other structures associated with the castle, former schools, parts of medieval walls, a farmhouse, a barn, a hotel, a former workhouse, public buildings, banks, a milestone, a railway viaduct, a bowling clubhouse, statues, one of Sir Robert Peel and the other of Ethelfleda, and a war memorial.


Key

Buildings

References

Citations

Sources

Lists of listed buildings in Staffordshire
L